James Valentine may refer to:

James Valentine (journalist) (fl. late 20th century), Australian; also musician
James Valentine (musician) (born 1978), guitarist of American band Maroon 5
James Valentine (photographer) (1815–1879), Scottish photographer
Jim Valentine (1866–1904), English rugby union footballer
James Valentine (RFC officer) (1887–1917), early English aviator and Royal Flying Corps pilot
James W. Valentine (fl. late 20th century), American biologist